The Surinamese dollar (ISO 4217 code SRD) has been the currency of Suriname since 2004. It is divided into 100 cent. The Surinamese dollar is normally abbreviated with the dollar sign $, or alternatively Sr$ to distinguish it from other dollar-denominated currencies. In spoken Surinamese Dutch, it is widely referred to by its acronym SRD, with "dollar" generally being understood as meaning the US dollar.

History
The dollar replaced the Surinamese guilder on 1 January 2004, with one dollar equal to 1,000 guilders. Initially, only coins were available, with banknotes delayed until mid-February, reportedly due to a problem at the printer, the Canadian Bank Note Company.

The old coins denominated in cents (i.e.  guilder) were declared to be worth their face value in the new cents, negating the necessity of producing new coins. Thus, for example, an old 25-cent coin, previously worth  guilder, was now worth  dollar (equivalent to 250 guilders). The rebasing of coins explicitly did not apply to commemorative coins.

Amendment 121 of ISO 4217 gave the currency the code SRD replacing the Suriname guilder (SRG).

The people of Suriname often refer to their currency as SRD to differentiate it from the US dollar, which is also used to quote prices for electronic goods, household furnishings and appliances, and automobiles.

The value of the Surinamese dollar (SRD) was set by the central bank between 2004 and 2021. As a result, black market currency exchange thrived. The Central Bank of Suriname spent much of Suriname's foreign currency reserves supporting the official exchange rates as inflation and other factors caused the real value of the Surinamese dollar to decline against other reserve currencies. In June 2021, the central bank devalued the SRD by 33% and announced the currency would float freely. By June 2022, official exchange rates begane to reflect the real floating exchange rate.

Historical official exchange rates of one U.S. dollar in Surinamese dollars

Coins
Coins in denominations of 1, 5, 10, 25, 100 and 250 cents from the previous currency are in circulation.

Banknotes
The Surinamese dollar replaced the Surinamese guilder on 1 January 2004, with one dollar equal to 1,000 guilders, prompting the issuance of notes denominated in the new currency. On the notes, the currency is expressed in the singular, as is the Dutch custom.

See also
Economy of Suriname
Central banks and currencies of the Caribbean
Guyanese dollar

References

External links

 Central Bank of Suriname
 Coins of Suriname
 Banknotes of Suriname

Economy of Suriname
Currencies introduced in 2004
Currencies of South America
Currencies of the Caribbean